United Kingdom aircraft test serials are used to externally identify aircraft flown within the United Kingdom without a full Certificate of Airworthiness. They can be used for testing experimental and prototype aircraft or modifications, pre-delivery flights for foreign customers and are sometimes referred to as "B" class markings.

1930s
An initial set of markings was introduced in 1929, each company was allocated a letter to which would follow a number, sometimes with a hyphen or a gap between. For example, A was allocated to the Armstrong Whitworth Aircraft and A 1 was used in March 1930 on an Armstrong Whitworth Starling. Sometimes Hawker and Vickers would also add the letters PV to the markings to indicate a private venture (that is a type in development not paid for by the Air Ministry).

1940s

The presentation was changed to look like a military serial for security reasons during the Second World War. For example, the prototype de Havilland Mosquito was allocated test markings E-0234.

1948
Following a change back to the original system in 1946 a new system was introduced on 1 January 1948. Each company was allocated a number which followed the British nationality marking G and then followed by an individual identity number. For example, Blackburn Aeroplane & Motor Company were allocated G-2 and the first allocation G-2-1 was used on a Miles Messenger used as an engine testbed for the Cirrus Bombardier. Companies could allocate and re-use the identities as they liked, some ran in sequence from 1 and others used the aircraft manufacturers serial number as part of the marking, for example G-51-200 was a Britten Norman Islander with a manufacturers serial number of 200. Allocations of codes from defunct companies have been reallocated.

Letter sequence 1929–1947

Numeric sequence since 1948

See also
 British military aircraft designation systems
 List of RAF squadron codes
 Royal Air Force roundels
 United Kingdom aircraft registration
 United Kingdom military aircraft serial numbers

References

Bibliography

British civil aircraft
Aircraft markings